Steve Pateman was the chief executive of Shawbrook Bank. He was previously an executive with Santander and Royal Bank of Scotland.

References 

Living people
Year of birth missing (living people)
British chief executives
British bankers